The term East Syrian or Eastern Syrian may refer to:

 eastern parts of the modern state of Syria
 eastern parts of historical region of Syria
 East Syrian Rite, alternative term for the East Syriac Rite
 East Syrian script, imprecise term for the East Syriac script
 East Syrian dialects, imprecise term for the East Syriac dialects

See also
 West Syrian (disambiguation)
 Syria (disambiguation)
 Syrian (disambiguation)
 Syriac (disambiguation)
 East Syriac (disambiguation)
 Syriac Rite (disambiguation)